The Artamonov Business, also translated as The Artamonovs or Decadence, is a novel by Maxim Gorky written during his 10-year emigration from Soviet Russia. It was published in Berlin in 1925 by Verlag "Kniga". Critics often call it Gorky's best novel, or best after The Life of Klim Samgin.

The plot concerns the three generations of a pre-revolutionary industrialist family, from the beginning of 1860s to the Revolution of 1917.

Plot 
Short after the abolishing of serfdom in Russia in 1860s, Ilya Artamonov, a serf himself, moves to the provincial town of Dromov with his sons Peter and Nikita, and Aleksei, the adopted nephew. In Dromov, Ilya makes Peter to marry the mayor's wife, Natalia Baimakova, and founds 'the Artamonov Business', the linen factory. After marrying Peter, Natalia losts all of her friends she had before because of the bad reputation of the Artamonov family they have in the town, as the locals view them as outsiders. Nikita secretly falls in love with her, but he doesn't tell her, and she suspects him as a spy put by the new husband. After an unsuccessful attempt of suicide, Nikita leaves the family and enters a monastery. Ilya dies when helping his workers to build the factory, and Peter becomes in charge of 'the family business'. 

After marrying Peter, Natalia losts all joys she had before, and Peter becomes the only close person to her. However, in their relationship they are not really close. Peter doesn't love her, and he himself is moody, clumsy and unsociable. By living with him, Natalia loses all her will to life. The only joy in the life of Peter is his son Ilya who becomes a student; Peter sees running the factory as his duty, but he feels nothing but disgust and maybe fear to it, and yet, it becomes the only purpose in his life. Peter insists that Ilya must inherit the family business because its the family duty, but Ilya refuses, and after quarelling with the father, Ilya leaves the family forever, and he is not to be ever encountered by Peter. Peter kills Ilya's friend whom he dislikes very much, "a scraggy little boy", by kicking him too hard; Aramonov's yardman Tikhon is the only person who knows about it, but he doesn't tell anyone, and even Peter doesn't know that he knows about it. The later plot is the history of disintegration of Peter's personality. At the end of his life, Peter retires from running the factory and completely isolates himself and falls into a sort of unconsciousness; his younger son Yakov becomes the head of the family business, but he gets murdered in 1917, after the February Revolution. One day, Peter wakes up and sees his home overtaken by Bolsheviks.

Reception 
D. S. Mirsky, the émigré critic and the author of The History of Russian Literature, who was very critical of Gorky before the novel came out, wrote that The Artamonov Business "is undoubtedly the best of Gorky's novels", and that "it belongs to one of the main traditions of Russian literature, to a great number of denunciations of Russian spiritual poverty, such as Oblomov, The Golovlyov Family and  Bunin's The Village."

After the novel was translated by Veronica Dewey as Decadence in 1927, it was criticized in the English-language press. The New York Times wrote that "compared with Mother and others of the author's earlier works, his latest offering is weak in treatment, chaotic in texture, and loose in its grip upon its subject-matter", while Time wrote that although "it is honest, impersonal realism, thoughtful though morose", "author Gorky's powers, however fully displayed here, have produced books that were far more readable than this one.

Later, after the new two translations came out, The Artamonov Business by Alec Brown (in 1948), and The Artamonovs by Helen Altschuler (in 1952), it was given a good estimate. Alan Hodge wrote in the preface to Alec Brown's translation: 

Irwin Weil called The Artamonov Business "perhaps Gorky's best single long work of fiction", while Richard Freeborn calls it "<Gorky's> best novel". Geoffrey Grigson wrote that "it is like a less sophisticated Buddenbrooks".

List of English translations 
 Veronica Dewey (1927, as Decadence, published by Cassell & Co., reissued in 1984 by Bison Books with a foreword by Irwin Weil)
 Alec Brown (1948, as The Artamonov Business, published by Hamish Hamilton and Pantheon Books, reissued by Grosset & Dunlap and with illustrations by Heron Books in 1968)
 Helen Altschuler (1952, as The Artamonovs, published by Foreign Languages Publishing House, reissued by Folio Society with illustrations and by Liberty Book Club in 1955)

Screen adaptations 
 1941 — The Artamonov Business, director Grigori Roshal. 
 1981 — Delo Artamonovykh, director Irina Sorokina (TV series).

References

External links 
 The Artamonov Business at the Internet Archive (translation by Alec Brown with a foreword by Alan Hodge) 

 Text of the novel in Russian 

1925 Russian novels
Novels by Maxim Gorky
Family saga novels
Novels set in the Russian Revolution
Novels set in 19th-century Russia
Novels set in 20th-century Russia
Russian novels adapted into films
Russian novels adapted into television shows
Novels set during World War I